Halonotius (common abbreviation Hns.) is a genus of halophilic archaea in the family of Halorubraceae.

References

Archaea genera
Taxa described in 2010
Euryarchaeota